Jaú is a municipality in the center of the state of São Paulo, in Brazil. The city takes its name from the native fish species jau.

History 

The history of the city goes back to 1853, when a group of people decided to settle and found a village. Not until 1889, however, did it achieve the status of town. Its most widely known inhabitant is João Ribeiro de Barros, the first man to travel from Europe to South America by plane, in 1927, 23 days before Charles Lindbergh's flight.

Economy 
Jaú is located in a tropical weather region, known for its very fertile lands, which were once called "terra roxa" (purple land). The city is known as the national capital of female shoes, which are exported to the whole world.

Sports 
Esporte Clube XV de Novembro is a traditional sport club of the town, founded in 1924. The club plays its home matches at Estádio Zezinho Magalhães. Jaú is also the birthplace of freestyle swimmer Renata Burgos, who represented Brazil at the 2004 Summer Olympics in Athens, Greece.

References 

 
1889 establishments in Brazil
Populated places established in 1889